Gmina Chmielnik may refer to either of the following administrative districts in Poland:
Gmina Chmielnik, Świętokrzyskie Voivodeship
Gmina Chmielnik, Subcarpathian Voivodeship